Balil (also Romanized as Balīl; also known as Bīlabīl) is a village in Khanandabil-e Sharqi Rural District, in the Central District of Khalkhal County, Ardabil Province, Iran. At the 2006 census, its population was 238, in 58 families.

References 

Towns and villages in Khalkhal County